The 1976 Montreal Expos season was the eighth season in the history of the franchise. The Expos finished in last place in the National League East with a record of 55–107, 46 games behind the Philadelphia Phillies. This was their final season at Jarry Park; they relocated to Olympic Stadium for the 1977 season.

Offseason 
 December 22, 1975: Rodney Scott was sent to the Expos by the Kansas City Royals to complete an earlier deal (the Royals sent a player to be named later to the Expos for Bob Stinson) made on March 31, 1975.
 Prior to 1976 season: Roger Freed was acquired from the Sultanes de Monterrey.

Spring training
The Expos held spring training at City Island Ball Park in Daytona Beach, Florida, their fourth season there.

Regular season 
 April 21, 1976: Shortstop Tim Foli (hitting in the number seven slot) hit for the cycle at Wrigley Field against the Chicago Cubs in front of a crowd of 7,277, the first in Expos history to achieve the feat. Pitcher Woodie Fryman picked up the victory.

Season standings

Record vs. opponents

Opening Day starters 
 Gary Carter
 Nate Colbert
 Tim Foli
 Mike Jorgensen
 Pete Mackanin
 Larry Parrish
 Bombo Rivera
 Steve Rogers
 Jerry White

Notable transactions 
 May 17: Steve Renko and Larry Biitner were traded to the Chicago Cubs for Andre Thornton.
 June 2: Nate Colbert was released.
 June 8: 1976 Major League Baseball draft
Dan Schatzeder was selected in the 3rd round, and signed June 18.
Jack O'Connor was selected in the 9th round, and signed June 18.
 July 21: Jim Dwyer and Pepe Mangual were traded to the New York Mets for Del Unser and Wayne Garrett.

Roster

Player stats

Batting

Starters by position 
Note: Pos = Position; G = Games played; AB = At bats; H = Hits; Avg. = Batting average; HR = Home runs; RBI = Runs batted in; SB = Stolen Bases

Other batters 
Note: G = Games played; AB = At bats; H = Hits; Avg. = Batting average; HR = Home runs; RBI = Runs batted in; SB = Stolen Bases

Pitching

Starting pitchers 
Note: G = Games pitched; IP = Innings pitched; W = Wins; L = Losses; ERA = Earned run average; SO = Strikeouts

Other pitchers 
Note: G = Games pitched; IP = Innings pitched; W = Wins; L = Losses; ERA = Earned run average; SO = Strikeouts

Relief pitchers 
Note: G = Games pitched; W = Wins; L = Losses; SV = Saves; ERA = Earned run average; SO = Strikeouts

Awards and honors 
1976 Major League Baseball All-Star Game
 Woodie Fryman, pitcher, reserve

Farm system 

LEAGUE CHAMPIONS: Denver

Notes

References

External links 
 1976 Montreal Expos at Baseball Reference
 1976 Montreal Expos at Baseball Almanac
 

Montreal Expos seasons
Montreal Expos season
1970s in Montreal
1976 in Quebec